Craig Lee Cotton (July 7, 1947December 21, 2013) was an American football tight end who played six seasons in the National Football League (NFL) with the Detroit Lions, Chicago Bears and San Diego Chargers. He was drafted by the Chargers in the eighth round of the 1969 NFL Draft. He played college football at Youngstown State University and attended Elizabeth High School in Elizabeth, Pennsylvania. Cotton was also a member of the Portland Storm of the World Football League.

References

External links
Just Sports Stats

1947 births
2013 deaths
People from Elizabeth, Pennsylvania
Players of American football from Pennsylvania
American football tight ends
African-American players of American football
Youngstown State Penguins football players
Detroit Lions players
Chicago Bears players
Portland Storm players
San Diego Chargers players
20th-century African-American sportspeople
21st-century African-American people